Gerald Joseph Brisson (September 3, 1937 – January 16, 2013) was a Canadian professional ice hockey left winger. He was born in Saint Boniface, Manitoba. He died at his home in Mesa, Arizona on January 16, 2013.

Playing career
Signed by the Montreal Canadiens organization at age 16, Brisson came up through the minor hockey ranks in St. Boniface, Manitoba to star with the St. Boniface Canadiens in the Manitoba Junior Hockey League, and later another Montreal Canadiens farm team, the Peterborough TPT's of the Ontario Junior Hockey Association, where he led the team in scoring with 51 points in 52 games. He started his professional hockey career in 1958 in the Western Hockey League (WHL), playing for the Winnipeg Warriors where he was one of the league's top rookies, earning 83 points in his first season, and compiling 91 goals and 103 assists in 3 full seasons with the Warriors. He next played for the WHL Spokane Comets for two seasons, matching his best season with another 83 points and earning a call up to the Montreal Canadiens where he played four games in the 1962-63 season, earning two assists. He made his National Hockey League (NHL) debut in the Montreal Forum against the Boston Bruins. He then went on to play in the WHL for the San Francisco Seals where he won a WHL Championship (1963–64), the Seattle Totems and again with the San Francisco Seals. He had a short stint in the American Hockey League (AHL) with the Quebec Aces and led MSHL St. Boniface Mohawks to a MSHL championship (1968–69) as a player-coach. Brisson was selected to numerous WHL All-star Teams during his career.

Coaching career
After an 11-year career as a professional hockey player, Brisson embarked on a 10-year career as a coach, general manager and Western Canada Hockey League (WCHL) franchise owner. He began was a player-coach for the St. Boniface Mohawks (1968–69), then coached the Manitoba Junior Hockey League (MJHL) West Kildonan North Stars for one season (1969–70), and made his WCHL coaching debut with the Brandon Wheat Kings (1970–71). Brisson returned to the MJHL for one season to coach the Winnipeg Monarchs (1971–72), then back to the WCHL to coach the Winnipeg Junior Jets (1972–73), Winnipeg Clubs (1973–76), Winnipeg Monarchs (1976–77) and finally the Calgary Wranglers (1977–78). Brisson later went on to coach the Innisfil Eagles of the Chinook Hockey League where he won a provincial title in the 1992-93 season.

Owner / builder career
Brisson was an owner in the Western Canada Hockey League (WCHL) for six years. After one year as coach, Brisson bought the Winnipeg Junior Jets in 1972. In order to differentiate from the newly-formed Winnipeg Jets of the WHA, he renamed his team the Winnipeg Clubs (1973–76), and later the Winnipeg Monarchs (1976–77). In 1977 he moved the franchise to Calgary, Alberta as the Calgary Wranglers. He sold the Wranglers franchise in 1979 and retired from hockey to pursue other business interests.

Awards and achievements
WHL Prairie Division First All-Star Team (1959)

Career statistics

Player

Coach

References

External links

1937 births
2013 deaths
Calgary Wranglers coaches
Canadian ice hockey coaches
Canadian ice hockey right wingers
Montreal Canadiens players
People from Saint Boniface, Winnipeg
Quebec Aces (AHL) players
St. Boniface Canadiens players
Seattle Totems (WHL) players
Ice hockey people from Winnipeg
Winnipeg Jets (WHL) coaches
Winnipeg Monarchs (WHL) coaches
Winnipeg Warriors (minor pro) players